Goran may refer to:

Ethnic groups 
Gorane, or Goran, an ethnic group of northern Africa
Goran (Kurdish tribe), an ethnic group of the Middle East
Gorani (ethnic group), an ethnic group of the southeastern Europe

Other uses 
Göran, a Swedish name
Goran (Slavic name), a Slavic name
Goran (Kurdish name), a Kurdish name
Goran language, a language of northern Africa
Goran, Azerbaijan, a village in Azerbaijan
Goran (film), a 2016 Croatian film

See also
Gorani (disambiguation)
Guran (disambiguation)

Language and nationality disambiguation pages